Pat Ryan (4 September 1886 – 14 August 1937) was a former Australian rules footballer who played with Carlton in the Victorian Football League (VFL).

Notes

External links 
		
Pat Ryan's profile at Blueseum

Australian rules footballers from Victoria (Australia)
Carlton Football Club players

1937 deaths
1886 births